P. A. Madhavan is an Indian National Congress politician from Thrissur and former Member of the
Kerala Legislative Assembly from Manaloor Assembly Constituency (2011-2016).
Son of P. Achuthan Nair and Malamelpattiath Parvathy Amma, he was born at Mundur, Thrissur on 14 September 1946 and
is a licensed Document Writer since 1967. 
           
As an active socio-political worker from the young age of 13, leading student agitations part of Vimochana Samaram has held offices of Indian Youth Congress Block President (1968-1969), Indian Youth Congress District Secretary (1969-1972), Indian Youth Congress District General Secretary (1972-1977), Indian Youth Congress District President (1977-1980).

Kerala Pradesh Congress Committee Executive Member (present), All India Congress Committee Member 2005-2012, District Congress Committee President 2016-2017, District Congress Committee Vice-President (2006–2011), District Congress Committee General Secretary (1980-2006),  United Democratic Front (Kerala) District Chairman (2006-2008); Thrissur District Panchayat Leader of Opposition (2000-2005).

Sitaram Spinning and Weaving Mills Director (1980-1983);  Mala Co-operative Spinning Mills Chairman (1996-2002); Malsya Vilpana Thozhilali  Sahakarana Sangham, Thrissur District President (Since 1994) .

Now, President, National Textile Corporation Show-Room Employees (Kerala), Kerala Laxmi Mills Pullazhi Employees Union, Railway Goods –Shed Workers Union, Thrissur, Municipal Corporation Electricity Employees Union, Thrissur, KSEB Thozhilali Union, Thrissur and Pharmaceutical Corporation Employees Union.

References

Malayali politicians
Politicians from Thrissur
Living people
Indian National Congress politicians from Kerala
Members of the Kerala Legislative Assembly
Year of birth missing (living people)